Girolamo Di Fazio, (born 23 June 1950 in Ramacca, Catania) is a former Police Commissioner.

Biography
In Catania he completed his classical studies and obtained his doctorate in Law el'abilitazione to the legal profession. In 1976 he attended the Institute in Rome and was assigned to the Police Commissioner of Police of Ostia Lido. Transferred to Palermo, he was assigned to the team, then directed by Boris Giuliano. He has worked with judges in Palermo Rocco Chinnici, Giovanni Falcone and Paolo Borsellino. In 1982 he was Director of the Commissioner of Police Piazza Armerina (Enna). In 1997 he assumed the leadership of Commissioner of Police of Acireale. Since 2004 he is the Quaestor of Ragusa.

The fight against Mafia
On 26 June 2010, he captured in Marseille, Giuseppe Falsone, Agrigento mafia boss. Falzone was shown in pizzini of Bernardo Provenzano, as number 28. Giuseppe Falsone is a member of the Sicilian Mafia. He is a fugitive and on the "Most wanted list" of the Italian ministry of the Interior since January 1999.

References

 Falsone computer lover. The picture of his arrest
 Giuseppe Falzone
 A great success for the people of Agrigento
 Statement by Minister of Justice

External links
 Newspaper Grandangolo, Winds murders
 Girolamo Di Fazio website
 La Repubblica Marseille boss arrested in Falsone faithful man Bernardo Provenzano
 La Repubblica Facial Plastic and business
 Welcome to the official website of the Polizia di Stato (English)
 World news

Notes
"There is more security together," phrase Girolamo Di Fazio, festa police in Agrigento

Living people
1950 births
Chiefs of police
Italian police officers